Peter Hartung (born  1959) is the director of the Holocaust denial organization Adelaide Institute having previously been a successful businessman and political adviser. He is a native of Adelaide, Australia.

Hartung assumed the role of director of the Adelaide Institute in 2009, following the incarceration of Fredrick Töben for three months in South Australia for contempt of court. On assuming the role from Toben, Hartung defied the Federal Court by publishing the revisionist material that led to Toben’s three months jail time.

References

External links 

1959 births
Living people
Australian bloggers
Australian people of German descent
Australian Holocaust deniers
People from Adelaide
Antisemitism in Australia